Horrors of the Z'Bri is a 1999 role-playing game supplement for Tribe 8 published by Dream Pod 9.

Contents
Horrors of the Z'Bri is a supplement in which the past and present of the Z'bri are detailed.

Reception
Horrors of the Z'Bri was reviewed in the online second version of Pyramid which said "The Z'Bri are the third part of the triumvirate of groups around which Tribe 8 is based. They are the monsters of the Tribe 8 setting. They don't eat flesh or drink blood (well, not all of them). They're extra-dimension entities of spirit who came to Earth to experience the pleasures of the flesh. Pleasure, of course, is such a variable term."

Reviews
Backstab #19

References

Role-playing game books
Role-playing game supplements introduced in 1999